Gabriel Vasile Rupanu (born 28 September 1997) is a Romanian rugby union player. He plays as a scrum-half for professional SuperLiga club Timișoara Saracens.

Club career
Gabriel Rupanu started playing rugby as a youth for a local school Romanian club based in Bârlad and then started his professional journey joining the youth ranks of the local team in the same city. After making a good impression Bârlad, under the supervision of several coaches including Ioan Harnagea, Ciprian Popa and Dan Tufaru, in early 2017 he was signed by SuperLiga side, Timișoara Saracens.

International career
Rupanu is also selected for Romania's national team, the Oaks, making his international debut in a test match against the Los Cóndores on 8 June 2019.

References

External links

 
 
 
 

1997 births
Living people
Sportspeople from Bârlad
Romanian rugby union players
Romania international rugby union players
SCM Rugby Timișoara players
Rugby union scrum-halves